Jan Hojer (born February 9, 1992) is a German professional rock climber. He is known for winning one World Cup and two European Championships in bouldering. In May 2010, he climbed Action Directe, still considered to be one of the most difficult routes in the world. From 2013 to 2015, he sent several  boulder problems.

Career 
Hojer started participating in German Lead climbing youth competitions in 2004, at the age of 10. From 2008 to 2010 he participated in the Lead Climbing World Cup. Since his performances in lead climbing were never outstanding, he quit competing in that discipline in 2011 and started competing in bouldering. Notable results started coming next year, when he ranked fifth in the Climbing World Championships. He won the seasonal title of the Bouldering Climbing World Cup in 2014 and finished second in 2015.

In 2015 and 2017 he won the Climbing European Championships in Bouldering.  Also in 2017, he won the silver medal at the Bouldering World Games in Wroclaw, Poland.

Hojer has won national championships in all climbing disciplines. He won the lead in 2008, 2017, and 2019. In bouldering he won in 2011, 2014, 2015, and 2016, finished second in 2017, and has not competed since. Hojer won the first German National Championship in the combined format in 2018, and in 2019 he won the only discipline that he hadn't won yet, speed.

He also obtained outstanding results in outdoor climbing. In May 2010, he climbed Action Directe, still considered to be one of the most difficult routes in the world. From 2013 to 2015, he sent several outdoor  boulder problems.

In 2019 Hojer qualified for the 2020 Summer Olympics through his performance at the IFSC Combined Qualifier event in Toulouse. Hojer finished 12th out of 20 at the Tokyo Olympics.

Results

Climbing World Cup

Climbing World Championships

Climbing European Championships

Number of medals in the Climbing World Cup

Bouldering

Rock climbing

Redpointed routes 

:
 Es Pontàs - Mallorca

:

Action Directe - Frankenjura (DEU)- May 22, 2010

:
 Pati noso - Siurana (ESP) - April 27, 2011
 Bah Bah Black Sheep - Céüse (FRA) - July 22, 2010

Boulder problems 
:
 Quoi de Neuf - Fontainebleau (FRA) - November 21, 2017
 From Dirt Grows the Flowers - Chironico (CHE) - March 8, 2015
The Story of Two Worlds - Cresciano (CHE) - April 11, 2014
 Le Marathon de Boissy - Fontainebleau (FRA) - March 2014 - First ascent.
 Trip Hop - Fontainebleau (FRA) - October 2013
 The Big Island - Fontainebleau (FRA) - January 2013.

:
 Jour de Chasse - Fontainebleau (FRA) - December 2013 - First ascent. Hojer graded it a soft 8C, possibly because he did not use a heel hook that, according to some repeaters, makes it easier to climb.
 Dreamtime - Cresciano (CHE) - February 18, 2013. Rated 8C by Hojer, who described it as "much harder than any 8B+ i've ever tried.."

References

External links 

 Jan Hojer on digitalrock.de
 Hojer's ascents on 8a.nu
 
 
 

1992 births
Living people
German rock climbers
World Games silver medalists
Competitors at the 2017 World Games
Sportspeople from Cologne
Sport climbers at the 2020 Summer Olympics
Olympic sport climbers of Germany
IFSC Climbing World Championships medalists
IFSC Climbing World Cup overall medalists
Boulder climbers